Psilocybe thaiduplicatocystidiata is a species of psilocybin mushroom in the family Hymenogastraceae. Found in Chiang Mai University Park (Chiang Mai Province, Thailand), where it grows on soil with rotting dung, it was described as new to science in 2012. The specific epithet thaiduplicatocystidiata refers to its dimorphic pleurocystidia and cheilocystidia, and to Thailand.

See also
List of Psilocybe species
List of psilocybin mushrooms

References

External links

Entheogens
Fungi described in 2012
Fungi of Asia
Psychoactive fungi
thaiduplicatocystidiata
Psychedelic tryptamine carriers
Taxa named by Gastón Guzmán